The British Academy Television Award for Best Single Documentary is one of the major categories of the British Academy Television Awards (BAFTAs), the primary awards ceremony of the British television industry. According to the BAFTA website, the category is "for one-off documentaries only. Includes individual episodes of documentary strands."

The category has gone through some name changes since its inception:
 It was first awarded as an individual recognition from 1964 to 1970.
 From 1978 to 1983 it was presented as Best Documentary.
 From 1984 to 2006 it was presented as Flaherty Documentary Award or Robert Flaherty Documentary  Award, also from 1984 to 1990, documentaries that used to compete for the BAFTA Award for Best Documentary competed in this category instead.
 Since 2007 it has been presented as Best Single Documentary.

Winners and nominees

1960s

1970s
Best Factual Documentary

Best Documentary

1980s

Flaherty Documentary Award

1990s

2000s

Best Single Documentary

2010s

2020s

Note: The series that don't have recipients on the tables had Production team credited as recipients for the award or nomination.

References

External links
List of winners at the British Academy of Film and Television Arts

Single Documentary